Sarcosine oxidase is an enzyme that catalyzes the oxidative demethylation of sarcosine to yield glycine, H2O2, 5,10-CH2-tetrahydrofolate in a reaction requiring H4-tetrahydrofolate and oxygen. Corynebacterial sarcosine oxidase is a heterotetramer and is produced as an inducible enzyme when Corynebacterium sp.is grown with sarcosine as source of carbon and energy.

Further reading

External links
 

EC 1.5.3